Ebrahimabad (also Romanized as Ebrāhīmābād) is a village in Khatunabad Rural District, in the Central District of Jiroft County, Kerman Province, Iran. At the 2006 census, its population was 561, in 126 families.

References 

Populated places in Jiroft County